Marco Tulli (20 November 1920 – 20 March 1982) was an Italian character actor, probably best known in the role of "Smilzo" in the Don Camillo film series.

Born in Rome, Tulli debuted as actor while he was still a university student, at the end of the Second World War. He was a prolific character actor in comedy films, often playing roles of curious and nosy persons. He was also very active on stage, in which he worked with Giorgio Strehler and Luciano Lucignani, and as television actor.

Selected filmography

References

External links 
 

Italian male film actors
1920 births
Male actors from Rome
Italian male television actors
Italian male stage actors
1982 deaths
20th-century Italian male actors
People of Lazian descent